William John Rieth, Jr. (June 20, 1916 – October 15, 1999) was an American football guard who played four seasons with the Cleveland Rams of the National Football League. He played college football at Carnegie Mellon University and attended Lorain High School in Lorain, Ohio.

References

External links
Just Sports Stats

1916 births
1999 deaths
Players of American football from Cleveland
American football guards
American football centers
Carnegie Mellon Tartans football players
Cleveland Rams players